"Down Neck" is the seventh episode of the HBO original series The Sopranos. It was written by Robin Green and Mitchell Burgess, and directed by Lorraine Senna Ferrara. The episode was the only one in the series directed by a woman. It aired on February 21, 1999.

Starring
 James Gandolfini as Tony Soprano
 Lorraine Bracco as Dr. Jennifer Melfi
 Edie Falco as Carmela Soprano
 Michael Imperioli as Christopher Moltisanti
 Dominic Chianese as Corrado Soprano, Jr.
 Vincent Pastore as Pussy Bonpensiero
 Steven Van Zandt as Silvio Dante
 Tony Sirico as Paulie Gualtieri *
 Robert Iler as Anthony Soprano, Jr.
 Jamie-Lynn Sigler as Meadow Soprano
 Nancy Marchand as Livia Soprano

* = credit only

Guest starring
 Joseph Siravo as Johnny Boy Soprano
 Laila Robbins as Young Livia Soprano
 Rocco Sisto as Young Junior Soprano
 David Beach as Dr. Peter Galani

Also guest starring

Synopsis
A.J. and his friends steal sacramental wine and turn up drunk at gym class. Tony and Carmela are called into A.J.'s Catholic school, where the psychologist tells them that A.J. may have ADD. A.J. is tested and determined to be borderline ADD. Tony scornfully rejects this and says A.J. is behaving like a normal 13-year-old.  Carmela supports his opinion and he walks out.

This incident prompts Tony to discuss incidents from his own childhood with Dr. Melfi: His mother once threatened to stick a fork in his eye if he did not stop bothering her. He saw his father beat someone up – "You could tell he knew what he was doing." Later, the same man offered Johnny Boy a chance to move to Reno, an escape from his gangster life; his mother said she would rather smother her children than take them to Nevada. He saw his father being arrested and felt proud to be his son. This occurred at the time of the 1967 Newark riots.

A.J. overhears his parents talking about Tony's psychiatrist and innocently tells his grandmother, who assumes that Tony is discussing her with the psychiatrist. She is poised to pass on this information to Junior but Tony happens to walk in before she can do so.

First appearances
 Johnny Soprano: Tony's deceased father who appears in flashbacks to his childhood. He was the long-time capo of the original Soprano crew (which later became known as the Gualtieri crew) until his death from emphysema in 1986. 
  Janice Soprano: Tony's older sister who appears as a child in flashbacks.
 Barbara Soprano: Tony's younger sister who appears as an infant in flashbacks.

Title reference
 "Down Neck" refers to the Ironbound section of Newark, New Jersey where Tony grew up.

Cultural references
 While being tested for ADD, A.J. mentions the animated series South Park, specifically the first episode, "Cartman Gets an Anal Probe."
 Dr. Melfi slightly misquotes George Santayana's words: "Those who cannot remember the past are condemned to repeat it."
 With Melfi, Tony mentions the murderers Leopold and Loeb.

References to past episodes
When Carmela mentions Meadow's suspicions about Tony's true occupation, flashbacks from "College" appear briefly.

Music
 The song played on the television during Tony's flashback to 1967 was a live performance of "I've Been Lonely Too Long" by The Rascals on The Ed Sullivan Show. During the scene, Tony's mother implies her husband was arrested because he's Italian. "They're always picking on Italians," she says. The irony in the scene is, three of the four members of the Rascals—Dino Danelli, Felix Cavaliere, and Eddie Brigati—were Italian Americans.
 The song played while Tony takes his Prozac and remembers his childhood is "White Rabbit" by Jefferson Airplane. It is also played when he makes ice-cream sundaes with A.J. and into the end credits.
 The song played when young Tony misses the bus and sees Johnny and Junior beating up a man is "Don't Bring Me Down" by The Animals.
 The song played when young Tony plays catch with Junior while Janice leaves with Johnny for the carnival is "Carrie Anne" by The Hollies.
 The song played when young Tony hides in the trunk of Johnny's car and follows him and Janice to the carnival is "Mystic Eyes" by Them.
 The song played when young Tony sees Junior, Johnny, and friends arrested at the carnival is "The Blue Danube" by Johann Strauss II.

Filming locations 
Listed in order of first appearance:

 Long Island City, Queens
 Newark, New Jersey
 West Caldwell, New Jersey
 Satin Dolls in Lodi, New Jersey
 West Orange, New Jersey
 Below the Pulaski Skyway in Jersey City, New Jersey
 Staten Island

Reception
Emily St. James of The A.V. Club retrospectively praised "Down Neck" as "an unusually focused episode. It rarely deviates from its central thesis about fathers and mothers and their sons." She considered the flashbacks to be "nicely constructed and handily paralleled with Tony's fears that his kids will find out what he does for a living." Alan Sepinwall praised Gandolfini's acting and also stated, in reference to the scene where AJ tells Livia of Tony's therapy sessions, that the episode's two plots "make a great comic combination because AJ is so oblivious [...] that he not only doesn't realize what he's telling Livia, but is invulnerable to her usual emotional manipulations. Once Livia decides that Tony goes to a psychiatrist to complain about her, she starts up the waterworks and loud self-pity, and AJ couldn't possibly be less interested in, or even aware of, this display. It's priceless."

See also 

 Host desecration, with regard to A.J.'s theft and misuse of the sacramental wine
 Michael B. Jordan, this future star appears here in one of his earliest roles playing one of the Rideland kids who chases young Tony Soprano.
 Tim Williams, this future TV pitchman for the Trivago hotel website also appears here in one of his earliest roles as Mr. Meskimmin
 Lorraine Senna Ferrara, who directed this episode, is the only woman to have ever directed one of the "Sopranos" 86 episodes.

References

External links
 "Jules, Janick. "The Pear in History, Literature, Popular Culture and Art." 
 "The Killers in a Nutshell"

External links
"Down Neck"  at HBO

The Sopranos (season 1) episodes
1999 American television episodes

fr:Pris à la gorge